Tang Chunling (born June 24, 1976 in Yitong, Siping, Jilin) is a Chinese field hockey player who competed in the 2000, 2004 and 2012 Summer Olympics.

In 2000, she was part of the Chinese team which finished fifth in the women's competition. She played all seven matches and scored one goal.

Four years later Tang finished fourth with the Chinese team in the women's competition. She played all six matches and scored four goals.

At the 2008 Summer Olympics, she was part of the Chinese team that won the silver medal.

In 2012, Tang was one of the team reserves.

References

External links
 
Profile at Yahoo! Sports

1976 births
Living people
Chinese female field hockey players
Field hockey players at the 2000 Summer Olympics
Field hockey players at the 2004 Summer Olympics
Field hockey players at the 2008 Summer Olympics
Field hockey players at the 2012 Summer Olympics
Olympic field hockey players of China
Olympic silver medalists for China
People from Siping
Asian Games medalists in field hockey
Olympic medalists in field hockey
Medalists at the 2008 Summer Olympics
Field hockey players at the 1998 Asian Games
Field hockey players at the 2002 Asian Games
Field hockey players at the 2006 Asian Games
Asian Games gold medalists for China
Asian Games bronze medalists for China
Medalists at the 1998 Asian Games
Medalists at the 2002 Asian Games
Medalists at the 2006 Asian Games
20th-century Chinese women